Braden is a given name that is popular in the United States and Canada. Its origin is confined to the British Isles and has two ancient sources.

The English meaning of Braden is "broad valley" or "broad hillside". The name has a strong Saxon origin and is most commonly found in the English county of Sussex. Additionally, there is a Braden (Braydon) Forest in Wiltshire, now mostly cut down, but it was mentioned in the Anglo-Saxon Chronicle as the site of a battle in 904 AD.

The Irish Gaelic surname is Ó Bradáin, meaning "descendant of Bradán". Bradán is an ancient Irish language word meaning "salmon". The bradán feasa is the Salmon of Wisdom in an Irish legend about Fionn MacCool. "Bradán", meaning salmon, is one of the Irish words suggested to be of pre-Indo-European origin.

The name has many alternate spellings, including: Bradan, Bradin, Bradun, Bradyn, Braedan, Braeden, Braedin, Braedon, Braedyn, Breadan, Breaden, Braidan, Braiden, Braidon, Braidun, Braidyn, Braydan, Brayden, Braydin, Braydon, or Braydyn. Some spellings have two d's (e.g. Bradden) but maintain the same pronunciation. It is in use for both boys and girls, but is more common for boys.

Notable people with the given name "Braden" include

Braden Allenby (born 1950), American scientist
Braden Barty (born 1970), American film producer
Braden Birch (born 1989), Canadian ice hockey player
Braden Bishop (born 1992), American baseball player
Braden Calvert (born 1995), Canadian curler
Braden Chapman/Maurer-Burns (born 1983), American drag queen also known as Mimi Imfurst
Braden Danner (born 1975), American actor
Braden Davy (born 1992), Scottish politician
Braden Eves (born 1999), American racing driver
Braden Gellenthien (born 1986), American archer
Braden Hamlin-Uele (born 1995), New Zealand rugby league footballer
Braden Holtby (born 1989), Canadian ice hockey player
Braden Hunt, American voice actor
Braden King (born 1971), American filmmaker
Braden Looper (born 1974), American baseball player
Braden Mann (born 1997), American football player
Braden Mclean (born 1991), Canadian volleyball player
Braden Schneider (born 2001), Canadian ice hockey player
Braden Schram (born 1992), Canadian football player
Braden Shewmake (born 1997), American baseball player
Braden Shipley (born 1992), American baseball player
Braden Smith (born 1996), American football player
Braden Smith (basketball) (born 2003), American basketball player
Braden Stewart (born 1996), New Zealand rugby union footballer
Braden Webb (born 1995), American baseball player
Braden Wilson (born 1989), American football player

See also
Braden (disambiguation), a disambiguation page for "Braden"
Braden (surname), a page for people with the surname "Braden"

Notes

English given names
English unisex given names
English masculine given names
English feminine given names